Research & Politics is a peer-reviewed open-access academic journal that covers research in political science. It was established in 2014 and is published by SAGE Publications on behalf of the Foundation Research & Politics.

Abstracting and indexing
The journal is abstracted and indexed in  Current Contents/Social and Behavioral Sciences, Scopus, and the Social Sciences Citation Index. According to the Journal Citation Reports, the journal has a 2021 impact factor of 4.357, ranking it 23rd out of 188 journals in the category "Political Science".

References

External links

Publications established in 2014
English-language journals
Political science journals
Creative Commons Attribution-licensed journals
SAGE Publishing academic journals